Stefan Szlachciński (20 February or November 1888 – ?) was a Polish politician, member of the Polish Christian Democratic Party and member of the Sejm of the Second Polish Republic of the second term (1928–1930).

Personal life

In 1906 he emigrated to the United States where he successfully completed technical studies. While in America he took an active part in "Falcon" Polish Gymnastic Society. In 1917 he entered the military school in Toronto, Canada. The same year he enrolled in Buffalo, New York as a volunteer for the Blue Army of general Józef Haller and he later served in the Polish Army in the 50th Infantry Regiment of Borderland Riflemen Francesco Nullo until January 15, 1922, achieving the rank of first lieutenant. For his service he was awarded the Cross of Valour. After the war he worked as a factory general manager for Wagon Factory specializing in the assembly of railway wagons and the repair of rolling stock.

On 15 August 1940, he was interned at the Auschwitz concentration camp as a political prisoner. His inmate number was 1797.

References

1888 births
Year of death missing
Polish Christian Democratic Party politicians
Polish emigrants to the United States
Blue Army (Poland) personnel
Polish Army personnel
Recipients of the Cross of Valour (Poland)